Shizra Mansab Ali Khan Kharal is a Pakistani politician who had been a member of the National Assembly of Pakistan, from March 2015 to May 2018.

Early life and education
She was born to Rai Mansab Ali Khan.

She hold a doctorate degree in English literature and is a graduate of the University of Glasgow.

Political career

She was elected to the National Assembly of Pakistan as a candidate of Pakistan Muslim League (N) from Constituency NA-137 (Nankana Sahib-III) in by-election held in 2015. She received 77,890 votes and defeated an independent candidate, Ijaz Shah.

She ran for the seat of national assembly as a candidate of PML-N from Constituency NA-118(Nankana Sahib-II) but was unsuccessful she received 61,413 votes against the victorious candidate of PTI  Ijaz Shah, who received 63,818 votes.

References

Living people
Pakistan Muslim League (N) MNAs
Punjabi people
Pakistani MNAs 2013–2018
Alumni of the University of Glasgow
Year of birth missing (living people)
People from Nankana Sahib District
Women members of the National Assembly of Pakistan
21st-century Pakistani women politicians